The United States District Court for the Western District of Oklahoma (in case citations, W.D. Okla. or W.D. Ok.) is a federal court in the Tenth Circuit (except for patent claims and claims against the U.S. government under the Tucker Act, which are appealed to the Federal Circuit).

The District was established on June 16, 1906, and became operational on November 16, 1907, with Oklahoma achieving statehood.

Organization 
The United States District Court for the Western District of Oklahoma is one of three federal judicial districts in Oklahoma. Court for the District is held at Lawton and Oklahoma City.

Enid and Ponca City Division comprises the following counties: Alfalfa, Garfield, Grant, Kay, Noble, and Payne.

Lawton and Mangum Division comprises the following counties: Beckham, Caddo, Comanche, Cotton, Greer, Harmon, Jackson, Jefferson, Kiowa, Stephens, Tillman, and Washita.

Oklahoma City, Guthrie,  Chickasha,  Pauls Valley, and Shawnee Division comprises the following counties: Blaine, Canadian, Cleveland, Garvin, Grady, Kingfisher, Lincoln, Logan, McClain, Oklahoma, and Pottawatomie.

Woodward Division comprises the following counties: Beaver, Cimarron, Custer, Dewey, Ellis, Harper, Major, Roger Mills, Texas, Woods, and Woodward.

The United States Attorney's Office for the Western District of Oklahoma represents the United States in civil and criminal litigation in the court.   the United States Attorney is Robert J. Troester.

Current judges 
:

Former judges

Chief judges

Succession of seats

See also 
 Courts of Oklahoma
 List of current United States district judges
 List of United States federal courthouses in Oklahoma

References

External links 
 

Oklahoma, Northern District
Oklahoma law
Garfield County, Oklahoma
Garvin County, Oklahoma
Grady County, Oklahoma
Greer County, Oklahoma
Kay County, Oklahoma
Lawton, Oklahoma
Logan County, Oklahoma
Oklahoma City
Pottawatomie County, Oklahoma
Woodward County, Oklahoma
1906 establishments in Oklahoma Territory
1907 establishments in Oklahoma
Courthouses in Oklahoma
Courts and tribunals established in 1906